Debila is a town and commune, and the capital of Debila District, in El Oued Province, Algeria. According to the 2008 census it has a population of 25,158, up from 20,088 in 1998, and an annual growth rate of 2.3%.

Climate

Debila has a hot desert climate (Köppen climate classification BWh), with very hot summers and mild winters. Rainfall is light and sporadic, and summers are particularly dry.

Transportation

From El Oued the N16 continues to Touggourt, and the N48 leads north towards Biskra.

Education

6.5% of the population has a tertiary education, and another 16.1% has completed secondary education. The overall literacy rate is 74.9%, and is 81.8% among males and 67.8% among females.

Localities
The commune of Debila is composed of six localities:

Débila
Akfadou
Drimini
Djedeïda
Chenaïba
Djamaa Mida

References

Neighbouring towns and cities

Communes of El Oued Province
El Oued Province